William Ernest Bold C.B.E. (6 May 187325 November 1953) was a long-serving municipal clerk of Perth, Western Australia. He is generally acknowledged to be the founding father of urban planning in Western Australia.

See also 
Municipal socialism
City Beautiful movement
City of Perth

References

1873 births
1953 deaths
Australian urban planners
People from Southport